Prithwi Malla was the king of the Malla dynasty. He ruled from 1295 CE. to 1319 CE (both the dates being approximates).

History
Prithwi Malla is held to be an important socio-political figure for the establishment or, as deduced from their architectural styles, restoration and reconsecration of the two temples of Lord Siva. These are Shaileshwar and Shnareshwar temple at the chalcolithic site of Dihar around 8 kilometres from Bishnupur.
Till date these two temples are of special importance not only for the devotees but also for the scholars and tourists.

References

Sources
 

Malla rulers of the Bankura
Kings of Mallabhum
Malla rulers
Mallabhum
13th-century Indian monarchs
14th-century Indian monarchs